Coastal Taranaki School is a rural area school located in Ōkato, Taranaki, New Zealand. Established in 2005, the school formed through the merger of a number of small primary schools and Okato College. As an area school, Coastal Taranaki School caters for the educational needs of students year 0 to 13.

Notes

External links
 Official Website
 Coastal Taranaki School Knowledge Net

New Plymouth District
Primary schools in New Zealand
Secondary schools in Taranaki
Schools in Taranaki
Educational institutions established in 2005
2005 establishments in New Zealand